Smartfood is an American brand of prepopped, flavored popcorn that is made by the Frito-Lay company.

History 
Smartfood was first created in 1985 by Andrew Martin - chairman and CEO,  Ken Meyers- VP of operations, and Martin's wife Annie Withey- VP of consumer relations, in Hampton, Connecticut.  Smartfood was first marketed under the registered brand name in 1985, and was manufactured in Marlborough, Massachusetts. Smartfood was brought to market with the help of the Yandow family. 

According to Martin, “Unlike the cheese popcorn already on the market, ours was made with real cheese and it didn't glow in the dark.  We wanted quality and we were up against the negative consumer image, because pre-popped popcorn in a bag was considered garbage, not worth the money because it is not fresh and you can make it better and cheaper at home."

In January 1989, the company was sold to Texas-based Frito-Lay for 15 million.

Withey and Martin later formed Annie's Homegrown, which markets macaroni and cheese, pasta, and other organic products.

See also
 List of popcorn brands

External links

 
 "The Din of Popcorn Fills the Land", in The New York Times
 "Smartfood Rides Popcorn Seesaw", in Advertising Age
 "The Snack Food That's Eating America", in Inc.

Brand name snack foods
Frito-Lay brands
Popcorn brands
Products introduced in 1985